= Labor Unit of Nurses and Health Employees =

Union of healthcare workers in Puerto Rico

ULEES
- Labor Unit of Nurses and Health Employees
- Unidad Laboral de Enfermeras(os), y Empleados de la Salud
- Founded: 1974
- Headquarters: Calle Héctor Salamán 354; Urb. Ext Roosevelt; Hato Rey
- Location: Puerto Rico
- Key people: Ana Meléndez, President
- Website: unidadlaboral.com

The Labor Unit of Nurses and Health Employees (Spanish: Unidad Laboral de Enfermeras(os), y Empleados de la Salud, ULEES) is a trade union of nurses and healthcare workers in Puerto Rico.

== History ==
ULEES was founded in 1974. For a long time, the union was led by Radamés Quiñones Aponte.

In 2010, ULEES led a picket line outside a hospital in Ponce, calling for a new collective bargaining agreement.

In 2020, ULEES called on the Puerto Rican government to investigate allegations that healthcare workers were prioritising friends and administration staff for COVID-19 vaccination. In the next year, the union alleged that some hospitals made healthcare workers come in for work even while they were sick with Covid.
